Klaus Friedrich Karl Hahn (4 December 1925 – 10 June 2019) was a German rower. He competed in the men's coxless pair event at the 1952 Summer Olympics, representing Saar. He died in June 2019 at the age of 93, leaving just two living former competitors who had represented Saar at the Olympics.

References

External links
 

1925 births
2019 deaths
German male rowers
Olympic rowers of Saar
Sportspeople from Heilbronn
Rowers at the 1952 Summer Olympics